The 1973 Family Circle Cup was a women's tennis tournament played on outdoor clay courts at the Sea Pines Plantation on Hilton Head Island, South Carolina in the United States. The event was part of the 1973 Virginia Slims Circuit. It was the inaugural edition of the tournament and was held from May 1 through May 5, 1973. Fourth-seeded Rosemary Casals won the singles title and earned $30,000 first-prize money.

Finals

Singles
 Rosemary Casals defeated  Nancy Richey 3–6, 6–1, 7–5

Doubles
 Françoise Dürr /  Betty Stöve defeated  Rosemary Casals /  Billie Jean King 3–6, 6–4, 6–3

References

External links
 Women's Tennis Association (WTA) tournament details

Family Circle Cup
Family Circle Cup
Charleston Open
Family Circle Cup
Family Circle Cup
Family Circle Cup